Tabernaemontana angulata is a species of plant in the family Apocynaceae. It is found in northeastern Brazil.

Use
In traditional Yanomami medicine, drinking a bark infusion from T. angulata is a treatment for intestinal worms.

References

angulata